Kharaneh IV (referred to as Kharaneh 4 in some sources) is an archaeological site in Jordan. The site contains evidence of human activity dating to the Late Pleistocene. Its main period of occupation was 18,900 to 16,600 BC.

Description 
Kharaneh IV is located in the Wadi Kharaneh near the town of Azraq, Jordan. It was first recorded by F. E. Zeuner in 1955. Excavations at the site began under M. Muheisen in the 1980s and were resumed in 2008 under the direction of Lisa Maher and Danielle Macdonald. In the 2010 field season, Maher's and Macdonald's team discovered two hut structures thought to be among the oldest habitation structures in the Levant. The site covers 21,000 square meters, and is the largest known Late Pleistocene site in the area.

Notably, the remains of brushwood structures dating to the Early Epipalaeolithic period have been found at Kharaneh IV. Tools and large concentrations of ochre and marine shells have also been found at the site.

In addition, woman's remains dated back to 19,200 years ago were discovered at Kharaneh IV in 2016, which might have been cremated, after being placed on top of a hut.

References 

1955 archaeological discoveries
Archaeological sites in Jordan
Megasites